Franklin Elmer Ellsworth Hamilton (August 9, 1866 in Pleasant Valley, Ohio – May 4, 1918) was an American bishop of the Methodist Episcopal Church, elected in 1916.

Birth and family
Franklin was the son of the Rev. William Patrick and Henrietta (Dean) Hamilton.  He married Mary Mackie Pierce April 25, 1895.  They had the following children:  Edward Pierce, Arthur Dean, and Elisabeth Louise.

Hamilton was the younger brother of John William Hamilton, also a bishop of the Methodist Episcopal Church.

Education
Franklin graduated from the Boston Latin School in 1883.  He then earned the A.B. degree at Harvard University in 1887.  He went on to earn the S.T.B. degree (1892) and the Ph.D. degree in 1899 at Boston University.  He was also elected Phi Beta Kappa. Hamilton continued his education with three years of post-graduate work at Berlin University, Germany, and in Paris, France.

Ordained and academic ministry
Hamilton entered the New England Annual Conference of the M.E. Church in 1891.  He was appointed to East Boston.  He then became the pastor at Newtonville.  His final pastorate was First Methodist of Boston.

Hamilton made a tour around the world in 1904–1905 in support of student missions  He was elected a delegate to the M.E. General Conferences of 1908–1916, as well as the Ecumenical conference of 1911.  He also was the president of the Old South Historical Society of Boston.

In 1907 Hamilton became the chancellor of the American University, Washington, D.C., serving in this position until elected to the episcopacy in 1916.  He served as a trustee of American before being elected chancellor.  His office was located at 1422 F St., N.W. in Washington, D.C.  He maintained two homes:  at the Hotel Hamilton in Washington, and in Milton, Massachusetts.

Episcopal ministry
Hamilton was elected to the episcopacy of the Methodist Episcopal Church at the 1916 General Conference of that denomination.  He served as resident bishop in Pittsburgh, Pennsylvania, from then until his death in 1918.

Selected writings
Why Did the Pilgrim Fathers Come to America
250th Anniversary Founding of Harvard University
200th Anniversary of the Birth of John Wesley
Cup of Fire, Methodist Book Concern, 1914.
contributions to magazines.

See also
List of bishops of the United Methodist Church

References
The Council of Bishops of the United Methodist Church 
Price, Carl F., Compiler and Editor:  Who's Who in American Methodism, New York:  E.B. Treat & Co., 1916.
 History of Pittsburgh and Environs, vol. 2; Chapter 22, "The Ecclesiastical History", p. 51.

External links
College Portrait Photo

Boston University School of Theology alumni
Leaders of American University
Bishops of the Methodist Episcopal Church
American Methodist Episcopal bishops
1866 births
1918 deaths
American historians of religion
Harvard University alumni
Boston Latin School alumni
Writers from Washington, D.C.
People from Milton, Massachusetts
20th-century Methodist bishops
Historians from Massachusetts